The following radio stations broadcast on FM frequency 91.5 MHz:

Argentina
 APA Radio San Pedro in San Pedro, Buenos Aires
 Casares in Carlos Casares, Buenos Aires
 Center Zone in Piedra Buena, Santa Cruz
 de la Bahía in Bahía Blanca, Buenos Aires
 Emanuel in Tabay, Corrientes
 Esfera in El Maitén, Chubut
 Estacionline in Funes, Santa Fe
 Comunidad in Rosario, Santa Fe
 Gigante in La Rioja
 Irupé in La Plata, Buenos Aires
 La Bomba in Villa Mercedes, San Luis
 QSL in Mar del Plata, Buenos Aires
 Radioactividad in Corrientes
 Radio María in Charata, Chaco
 Radio María in Chajarí, Entre Ríos
 Radio Maria in Perico, Jujuy
 Radio María in San Javier, Misiones
 Radio María in Orán, Salta
 Radio María in Carlos Pellegrini, Santa Fe
 Radio María in Villa Ocampo, Santa Fe 
 Sol in Santa Fe de la Vera Cruz, Santa Fe
 Tropical Latina in Pergamino, Buenos Aires

Australia 
 2KY in Parkes, New South Wales
 Triple J in Grafton, New South Wales
 Darwin FM in Darwin, Northern Territory
 3PTV in Melbourne, Victoria

Canada (Channel 218)
 CBAF-FM-3 in Campbellton, New Brunswick
 CBAX-FM in Halifax, Nova Scotia
 CBCO-FM in Orillia, Ontario
 CBGA-3-FM in Riviere-au-Renard, Quebec
 CBO-FM in Ottawa, Ontario
 CBU-3-FM in Pemberton, British Columbia
 CBVX-FM-2 in La Malbaie, Quebec
 CBXS-FM in Swan Hills, Alberta
 CBXZ-FM in Tofino, British Columbia
 CBYG-FM in Prince George, British Columbia
 CHLM-FM-1 in Amos/Val d'Or, Quebec
 CIWM-FM in Brandon, Manitoba
 CKBT-FM in Kitchener/Waterloo, Ontario
 CKBZ-FM-5 in Sun Peaks, British Columbia
 CKPR-FM in Thunder Bay, Ontario
 CKXR-FM in Salmon Arm, British Columbia
 CKXY-FM in Cochrane, Alberta 
 VF2202 in Kemano, British Columbia
 VF2563 in Spences Bridge, British Columbia
 VF2572 in Ashcroft, British Columbia
 VF7159 in Vancouver, British Columbia
 VF8014 in Montmagny, Quebec

China
 CNR The Voice of China in Benxi County
 CNR Business Radio in Luzhou
 CRI Easy FM in Beijing

Japan
 HBC Radio in Sapporo, Hokkaido
 RKB Radio in Kitakyushu, Fukuoka

Malaysia
 Radio IKIM in Klang Valley

Mexico
XHCCQ-FM in Cancún, Quintana Roo
XHCMA-FM in Nejapa de Madero, Oaxaca
XHCSDJ-FM in Velardeña, Durango
XHDH-FM in Ciudad Acuña, Coahuila
XHDRO-FM in San Pedro de las Colonias, Coahuila
XHGEO-FM in Guadalajara, Jalisco
XHJC-FM in Mexicali, Baja California
XHMPJ-FM in San José del Cabo, Baja California Sur
XHMRL-FM in Morelia, Michoacán
XHSOA-FM in Caborca, Sonora
XHTAC-FM in Tapachula, Chiapas
XHTL-FM in Tuxpan, Veracruz
XHYF-FM in Hermosillo, Sonora
XHZTS-FM in Zacatecas, Zacatecas

Philippines
 DWKY in Metro Manila
 DYHR in Cebu City
 DXKX in Davao City
 DWED in Legazpi City
 DXKZ in Zamboanga City

Taiwan
 Free FM in Rende, Tainan
 Hit Fm in Taichung
 National Education Radio in Matsu
 Voice of Pacific in Yilan

Trinidad and Tobago
 Mad FM

United Kingdom
 BBC Radio 3
 BBC Radio Wales - Rhymney Transmitter

United States (Channel 218)
  in Great Falls, Montana
 KAIA (FM) in Bloomfield, Missouri
  in Aspen, Colorado
  in Hot Springs, Arkansas
 KANU (FM) in Lawrence, Kansas
  in Independence, Kansas
  in Fairfield, California
  in De Ridder, Louisiana
  in Big Spring, Texas
 KBLC in Fredericksburg, Texas
  in Boise, Idaho
  in Rexburg, Idaho
 KCAS in McCook, Texas
 KCBK in Frederick, Oklahoma
  in Saint Cloud, Minnesota
 KCMH (FM) in Mountain Home, Arkansas
 KDAN in Marshall, California
 KDCJ in Kermit, Texas
 KDKY in Marathon, Texas
 KDOB in Brookings, Oregon
 KEFL in Kirksville, Missouri
 KFBR in Gerlach, Nevada
  in Albuquerque, New Mexico
 KGAC in Saint Peter, Minnesota
 KGHI in Westport, Washington
  in Grambling, Louisiana
 KHML in Madisonville, Texas
  in Bloomington, Texas
  in Omaha, Nebraska
 KIXV in Muleshoe, Texas
 KJWM in Grand Island, Nebraska
 KJZZ (FM) in Phoenix, Arizona
  in Cupertino, California
 KLHT-FM in Honolulu, Hawaii
 KLOP in Holy Cross, Alaska
  in Moses Lake, Washington
 KMOP in Garapan, Northern Marianas Islands
 KNCC (FM) in Elko, Nevada
  in Bayside, California
 KNPM in Miles City, Montana
 KNSM in Mason City, Iowa
 KNSU in Thibodaux, Louisiana
  in Fergus Falls, Minnesota
 KNWU in Forks, Washington
  in Portland, Oregon
 KPAE in Erwinville, Louisiana
 KPDE in Eden, Texas
  in Plains, Montana
  in Jamestown, North Dakota
 KQCI in Freer, Texas
  in Thief River Falls, Minnesota
 KQXI in Granite Falls, Washington
 KRCC in Colorado Springs, Colorado
 KRNE-FM in Merriman, Nebraska
  in Lompoc, California
 KRUX in Las Cruces, New Mexico
  in Rio Vista, California
 KRVP in Falfurrias, Texas
  in Saint Louis, Missouri
  in Cortez, Colorado
  in Fresno, California
  in Norton, Kansas
 KSNS in Medicine Lodge, Kansas
 KSQM in Sequim, Washington
  in Roseburg, Oregon
  in Fairbanks, Alaska
  in Texarkana, Texas
 KTXP in Bushland, Texas
 KUBS in Newport, Washington
 KUHC in Stratford, Texas
  in Greeley, Colorado
  in Las Vegas, Nevada
 KUSC in Los Angeles, California
  in Logan, Utah
  in Sundance, Wyoming
  in Henryetta, Oklahoma
 KVHR in Van Horn, Texas
 KVYA in Cedarville, California
 KWLD (FM) in Plainview, Texas
  in Florence, Oregon
  in Sacramento, California
 KYFA-FM in Ginger, Texas
 KYFB in Denison, Texas
 KZCF in Atwater, California
 KZNZ in Elkhart, Kansas
  in Willits, California
  in Holly Hill, Florida
 WAVI in Oxford, Mississippi
 WBEZ in Chicago, Illinois
  in Mcdaniels, Kentucky
 WBIE in Delphos, Ohio
  in Bridgewater, Massachusetts
  in Baltimore, Maryland
  in Atlantic Beach, North Carolina
 WCDH in Shenandoah, Pennsylvania
  in Pekin, Illinois
 WCIE (FM) in New Port Richey, Florida
 WCNB in Dayton, Indiana
  in Coventry, Rhode Island
 WDBK in Blackwood, New Jersey
  in Langdale, Alabama
  in Richmond, Indiana
  in Green Bay, Wisconsin
  in Henderson, Tennessee
  in Lebanon, Tennessee
  in Tallahassee, Florida
  in Attica, Indiana
  in Bolton, Vermont
  in West Liberty, West Virginia
  in Vidalia, Georgia
  in Greencastle, Indiana
  in Guilford, Connecticut
 WGTT in Emeralda, Florida
  in Bristol, Tennessee
  in Columbus, Ohio
  in Traverse City, Michigan
 WJBP in Red Bank, Tennessee
  in Cicero, Indiana
 WJHS (FM) in Columbia City, Indiana
  in Seymour, Indiana
  in Raco, Michigan
 WJGS in Norwood, Georgia
 WJWA in Evansville, Indiana
  in Fort Myers, Florida
  in Ladson, South Carolina
 WKHR in Bainbridge, Ohio
  in New Philadelphia, Ohio
 WKWM in Marathon, Florida
 WLGQ in Gadsden, Alabama
  in Casey, Illinois
  in Greenville, Mississippi
  in Lexington, Virginia
  in Medford, Massachusetts
  in South Hadley, Massachusetts
  in Mount Pleasant, Michigan
  in Cocoa, Florida
  in Milton, Massachusetts
 WNIQ in Sterling, Illinois
 WNRZ in Dickson, Tennessee
 WNYE (FM) in New York, New York
  in Oberlin, Ohio
 WOOL (FM) in Bellows Falls, Vermont
 WOSP (FM) in Portsmouth, Ohio
 WPAU in Palmyra Township, Pennsylvania
 WPEF in Kentwood, Louisiana
  in Dublin, Virginia
 WPJW in Hurricane, West Virginia
 WPRK in Winter Park, Florida
 WPSF in Clewiston, Florida
 WPSU (FM) in State College, Pennsylvania
  in Lewiston, Maine
 WRFJ in Fort Mill, South Carolina
  in Indianapolis, Indiana
  in Troy, New York
  in Middlebourne, West Virginia
  in Sandwich, Massachusetts
 WSJQ in Pascoag, Rhode Island
  in Binghamton, New York
  in Swarthmore, Pennsylvania
 WSTF (FM) in Andalusia, Alabama
  in Chiefland, Florida
  in Greenville, South Carolina
  in Tullahoma, Tennessee
 WTUL in New Orleans, Louisiana
 WTYG in Sparr, Florida
  in Tuscaloosa, Alabama
 WUMF in Farmington, Maine
  in Lowell, Massachusetts
 WUMZ in Gloucester, Massachusetts
 WUNC (FM) in Chapel Hill, North Carolina
 WUPX (FM) in Marquette, Michigan
 WVAV in Vicksburg, Michigan
  in Iron Mountain, Michigan
  in Keavy, Kentucky
  in Herkimer, New York
 WVMV in China Township, Michigan
 WVOI in Everglades City, Florida
  in Cumming, Georgia
  in Lyndonville, Vermont
  in Rochester, New York
 WYCS in Yorktown, Virginia
  in Wellesley, Massachusetts

References

Lists of radio stations by frequency